Dubai Group is an Emirati investment company based in the United Arab Emirates, and a subsidiary of Dubai Holding. The company was founded in 2000 as the Investment Office, and was renamed Dubai Group in 2005. Through its companies, the group focuses on banking, investments and insurance in the United Arab Emirates and globally.

The group consists of three companies, each with its respective focal point:   
 Dubai Investment Group
 Dubai Banking Group
 Noor Investment Group.

References

External links
Official website

Companies based in Dubai
Investment companies of the United Arab Emirates